Freya Ravensbergen is a Canadian actress and producer. The first feature film she appeared in was The Legend of Sorrow Creek (2007) where she played Kayla. She is credited as an actor and co-producer of A Brand New You (2014) and Fucking My Way Back Home (2016). In 2006 and 2007 was a voice actress for the character Ginchiyo Tachibana in the video game series Samurai Warriors 2.

Early life
Freya hails from Hemmingford, Quebec, where she grew up on a farm. Her father is a documentary filmmaker and her mother is a teacher. As a youngster she took part in the Hemmingford ShoeString Theatre. She later studied at the Professional Theatre program of Dawson College and at Concordia University in Montreal.

Career
Her first feature film appearance was The Legend of Sorrow Creek (2007) where she played Kayla. She later co-produced and starred in A Brand New You (2014) which was listed in a NOW Magazine 2015 wrap up of "films worth a watch". She stars in the upcoming feature film Fucking My Way Back Home playing the character of Lydia, a sex worker who is looking for redemption. She is credited as a co-producer for this film as well.

Personal life
Freya is married to actor Clinton Pontes.  She is a mother and is active on the Toronto ACTRA Women's Committee where she lobbied for parental benefits

Filmography

References

External links

Actresses from Quebec
Anglophone Quebec people
Canadian film actresses
Canadian television actresses
Canadian voice actresses
21st-century Canadian actresses
Concordia University alumni
Living people
People from Montérégie
Dawson College alumni
Year of birth missing (living people)
Canadian video game actresses